A hafada piercing is a surface piercing anywhere on the skin of the scrotum. This piercing does not penetrate deep into the scrotum, and due to the looseness and flexibility of the skin in that area, does not migrate or reject as much as many other surface piercings.  A piercing that passes through the scrotum, from front-to-back, or from side-to-side, is known as a transscrotal piercing.  Multiple hafada piercings are not uncommon as an extension of a frenum ladder.

Jewelry
Hafada piercings are usually pierced with a captive bead ring, a curved barbell or straight barbell.

Healing 
The healing is relatively uncomplicated and lasts normally between six and eight weeks.

Gallery

References

Tampa, Mircea; Sarbu, Maria Isabela; Limbau, Alexandra; Costescu, Monica; Benea, Vasile; and Georgescu, Simona Roxana (2015) "Genital Male Piercings," Journal of Mind and Medical Sciences Vol. 2 : Iss. 1, Article 3. Available at: http://scholar.valpo.edu/jmms/vol2/iss1/3

Male genital piercings
Scrotum